Pouteria cayennensis is a species of plant in the family Sapotaceae. It is found in French Guiana, Guyana, and Venezuela.

References

cayennensis
Least concern plants
Taxonomy articles created by Polbot